SQR may refer to:

Biochemistry
 Succinate-Q reductase, an enzyme complex
 sulfide:quinone oxidorreductase pathway, see Microbial oxidation of sulfur

Computing
 SQR, a programming language
 SQR codes, Secure Quick Response codes

Linguistics
 Siculo-Arabic (ISO 639 language code: sqr)
 Smiting-blade symbol (hieroglyph)

Mathematics
 square (algebra) (sqr, sq)
 square root (sqr, sqrt)

Transportation
 Soroako Airport (IATA airport code SQR) Soroako, South Sulawesi, Indonesia
 Alsaqer Aviation (ICAO airline code SQR) defunct Libyan airline, see List of airline codes (A)
 Sultanpur Lodi (Indian rail code SQR), see List of railway stations in India

Other uses
 SQR Department Store, see Downtown Anaheim

See also

 
 Square (disambiguation)